Prudential BSN Takaful Berhad (PruBSN) is a Malaysian takaful company. It was founded in 2006 and is a joint venture between Bank Simpanan Nasional and Prudential plc, who have 51 and 49 percent stakes respectively. The company is a provider of both family and general takaful.

For six successive years since 2011, PruBSN has been the Number 1 Family Takaful Operator and in 2016, our company achieved New Business Production of RM446 million with a 32.5% market share as confirmed by the industry rating agency, Insurance Services Malaysia. In 2015, it won various awards including 'Best Takaful Institution' by The Asset.

PruBSN has an agency force of more than 16,000 and partners with Standard Chartered Saadiq, Affin Islamic Bank and Lembaga Pembiayaan Perumahan Sektor Awam (previously known as Bahagian Pinjaman Perumahan, BPP) to distribute their products. In 2013, it began advancing the use of mobile point-of-sales to sell products instantly through debit or credit cards. As of April 2015, more than 50 percent of sales were conducted on the mobile platform.

References

External links
 
 PruBSN Warisan

Takaful companies of Malaysia
Companies based in Kuala Lumpur
Financial services companies established in 2006
2006 establishments in Malaysia
Privately held companies of Malaysia
Prudential plc